The 2022 Italian general election was held on 25 September, resulting in a majority of seats of both houses of the Italian Parliament for the centre-right coalition. The Meloni Cabinet was announced on 21 October and was officially sworn in on the next day. The first Cabinet headed by a female Prime Minister of Italy, it was variously described as a shift to the political right, as well as the first far-right-led Italian government since World War II. The Meloni Cabinet successufully won the confidence votes on 25–26 October with a comfortable majority in both houses of Parliament.

Voter turnout 
Voter turnout was the lowest in the history of republican Italy at 63.9%, about 9 percentage points below the 2018 election.

Chamber of Deputies

Vote and seats share

Results by constituency

Senate of the Republic

Vote and seats share

Results by constituency

Analysis of proportionality 
Using the Gallagher index, the disproportionality of both houses was 12.31 and 10.83. For comparison, the disproportionality in the 2018 election was 5.50 and 6.12.

Leaders' races

Electorate demographics

See also 
 Results of the 1996 Italian general election

References 

General elections in Italy
Election results in Italy